The War Eagle Conference is a 11-team high school athletic conference in Northwest Iowa. The schools are classified as 1A and 2A, the two smallest classes in Iowa. The conference is widely recognized as one of the best small school baseball conferences in the state, often sending multiple teams to the state tournament. The WEC has also been successful in boys basketball housing multiple state champions, the most recent being South O’Brien boys in 2015–16 as Class 1A state champions at a record of 25–3. Remsen St. Mary’s has been the most recent qualifiers the past two seasons (2016 and 2017)

List of member schools

Incoming member

History
After years of stability as a ten-team league, 2009 saw the league add Remsen-Union (formerly of the Western Valley Activities Conference) and Hartley–Melvin–Sanborn (formerly a Siouxland Conference member). In 2010, Sergeant Bluff-Luton, the lone 3A school in the conference, left the conference to join the Missouri River Activities Conference, which contains four large schools in nearby Sioux City and two Council Bluffs schools. Spalding Catholic merged with Gehlen Catholic before the 2013–14 school year. Trinity Christian of Hull took Spalding Catholic's spot in the schedule. The War Eagle Conference accepted Harris–Lake Park and Clay Central–Everly at the beginning of the 2014–15 and 2015–16 school years, respectively, after the dissolution of the Cornbelt Conference. Starting with the 2016–17 school year, Marcus-Meriden-Cleghorn merged with Remsen-Union to form the MMCRU Royals.

On March 11, 2019, Clay Central–Everly announced it would be closing its high school at the end of that school year, effectively ceasing all athletics. Students are now sent to Spencer.

On 20 September 2022, current Siouxland Conference member George-Little Rock applied for membership to the War Eagle Conference. The War Eagle Conference accepted the Mustangs on October 20, 2022.

In October 2022, Unity Christian announced that their membership application to the Siouxland Conference had been accepted for the 2023-2024 school year, and therefore would no longer be members of the War Eagle Conference.

Sports
The conference offers the following sports:

 Fall — Volleyball, boys' cross-country, and girls' cross-country.
 Winter — Boys' basketball, girls' basketball, and wrestling.
 Spring — Boys' track and field, girls' track and field, boys' golf, and girls' golf.
 Summer — Baseball and softball.

External links
 Official site

References

High school sports in Iowa